Finger Point is a narrow rocky point forming the eastern extremity of The Flatiron, in Granite Harbour, Victoria Land. It was mapped and descriptively named by the British Antarctic Expedition, 1910–13, under Robert Falcon Scott.

References 

Headlands of Victoria Land
Scott Coast